Michał Pasiut (born 29 June 1991) is a Polish slalom canoeist who has competed at the international level since 2008.

He won two medals in the K1 team event at the ICF Canoe Slalom World Championships with a silver in 2018 and a bronze in 2019. He also won two silver medals in the same event at the European Championships.

World Cup individual podiums

References

External links

Living people
Polish male canoeists
1991 births
Medalists at the ICF Canoe Slalom World Championships
Sportspeople from Nowy Sącz